The 1991 Citizen Cup was a women's tennis tournament played on outdoor clay courts at the Am Rothenbaum in Hamburg in West Germany that was part of the Tier II category of the 1991 WTA Tour. It was the 14th edition of the tournament and was held from 29 April until 5 May 1991. Second-seeded Steffi Graf won the singles title, her fifth consecutive at the event.

Finals

Singles
 Steffi Graf defeated  Monica Seles 7–5, 6–7(4–7), 6–3
 It was Graf's 2nd singles title of the year and the 56th of her career.

Doubles
 Jana Novotná /  Larisa Neiland defeated  Arantxa Sánchez Vicario /  Helena Suková 7–5, 6–1

References

External links
 ITF tournament edition details
 Tournament draws

Citizen Cup
WTA Hamburg
Citizen Cup
Citizen Cup
Citizen Cup
1991 in German tennis